The Saint Kitts and Nevis Labour Party (SKNLP), also known simply as Labour, is a centre-left political party in Saint Kitts and Nevis. It is currently in government in the country after winning six of the eleven seats in the 2022 general election. It is the oldest active political party in the English-speaking Caribbean.

History
The party was founded in 1932, and was initially known as the St Kitts Workers' League. It put forward two candidates in the 1937 elections, both of which were elected. It subsequently won all the elected seats in 1940, 1943 and 1946.

From 1946 until 1978 the party was led by Robert Bradshaw. It saw most of its success on Saint Kitts, as voters on Nevis and Anguilla tended to elect independents and local parties. It was the only party to contest the 1952 elections and won all eight seats. They retained power in the 1957 despite losing three seats to independents. The party was also victorious in 1961, and were renamed the St Kitts-Nevis-Anguilla Labour Party in 1966. They went on to win the 1966, 1971 and 1975 elections, winning seven seats on each occasion.

When Anguilla seceded in 1980, the party adopted its current name. In the elections that year the party was reduced to four seats, and although it was the largest faction in the National Assembly, the opposition People's Action Movement was able to form a coalition government. The Labour Party was reduced to two seats in the 1984 elections, and remained with only two MPs after the 1989 elections. Although it received the most votes in the 1993 elections and won the same number of seats as the PAM, the PAM remained in power. However, early elections were called in 1995, in which the Labour Party won a majority of seats. They increased their majority in the 2000 elections and retained power in elections in 2004 and 2010.

After Labour suffered defeats in 2015 and 2020, Denzil Douglas decided to step down as party leader in 2021.  Party chairman Terrance Drew was elected as his successor in a national convention. Earl Asim Martin became the new party chairman.

Leadership
 Robert Llewellyn Bradshaw, 1945-1978
 Paul Southwell, 1978-1979
 Lee Moore, 1979-1989
 Denzil Douglas, 1989-2021
 Terrance Drew, 2021-

Election results

References

External links
Official website
St Kitts National Young Labour (Defunct)

Former member parties of the Socialist International
Labour parties
Political parties in Saint Kitts and Nevis
Political parties established in 1932
Socialist parties in North America
1932 establishments in Saint Kitts-Nevis-Anguilla